Perry Township is one of eleven townships in Thurston County, Nebraska, United States. The population was 235 at the 2020 census.

A portion of the Village of Emerson lies within the Township.

See also
County government in Nebraska

References

External links
City-Data.com

Townships in Thurston County, Nebraska
Townships in Nebraska